Jan Młodożeniec (born in 1929 in Warsaw, Poland; died 2000) was a Polish graphic designer.  He worked in posters, drawing, book and publication design, and illustration.

He studied from 1948 to 1955 at the Warsaw Academy of Fine Arts in the Department of Graphic Arts and Posters of Henryk Tomaszewski.

He was a member of Alliance Graphique International (AGI).

Major awards
1965 - Special award, Film Poster Exhibition, Warsaw (Poland)
1965 - Second prize, International Film Poster Exhibition, Vienna  (Italy)
1971 - Silver medal, Polish Poster Biennale, Katowice (Poland)
1977 - Bronze medal, Polish Poster Biennale, Katowice (Poland)
1980 - Gold medal, International Poster Biennale in Warsaw (Poland)
1981 - Bronze medal, Polish Poster Biennale, Katowice (Poland)
1981 - Gold medal, Polish Poster Biennale, Katowice (Poland)
1983 - First prize, Poster Biennale in Lahti (Finland)

See also
List of graphic designers
List of Polish painters
List of Polish graphic designers
Graphic design

References

External links
Jan Młodożeniec Posters at Polish poster gallery
Contemporary Posters - Jan Mlodozeniec's Posters
Jan Młodożeniec Poster Show at culture.pl

Polish graphic designers
Polish poster artists
Polish illustrators
1929 births
2000 deaths